Derbyshire County Cricket Club in 1913 was the cricket season when the English club  Derbyshire had been playing for forty two years. It was their nineteenth season in the County Championship and  they won four matches to finish thirteenth in the Championship table.

1913 season
Derbyshire played eighteen matches which were all in the County Championship. After winning their first three matches convincingly the team's form declined and they did not win again until the last match of the season.

Richard Baggallay was in his first year as captain.  Leonard Oliver scored most runs and Thomas Forrester took most wickets.

First class cricket was suspended for the duration of the war, and most of the new players in the season had their potential limitied after 1914.  Of the players who made their debut the greatest contributor was Harold Wild who played 32 matches in four seasons. Thomas Revill also played intermittently over four seasons. Norton Hughes-Hallett played in the two seasons before the war, while  Terence Cole and Willie Smith only appeared in the 1913 season.

Matches

{| class="wikitable" width="100%"
! bgcolor="#efefef" colspan=6 | List of  matches
|- bgcolor="#efefef"
!No.
!Date
!V
!Result 
!Margin
!Notes
|- 
|1
|12 May 1913 
| Essex   County Ground, Leyton 
|bgcolor="#00FF00"|Won
| 9 wickets
 | Tremlin 5-46 
|- 
|2
|15 May 1913 
| Hampshire  County Ground, Southampton 
|bgcolor="#00FF00"|Won
| 8 wickets
 | Bowell 103; T Forrester 5-88 
|- 
|3
|21 May 1913 
| Warwickshire  County Ground, Derby 
|bgcolor="#00FF00"|Won
| 7 wickets
 | L Oliver 103; Foster 5-54 
|- 
|4
|30 May 1913 
| Lancashire  Queen's Park, Chesterfield 
|bgcolor="#FF0000"|Lost
| Innings and 25 runs
 | AG Slater 5-43; Dean 6-45; Whitehead 7-61 
|- 
|5
|05 Jun 1913 
| SomersetCounty Ground, Taunton 
|bgcolor="#FF0000"|Lost
| 91 runs
 | CF Root 6-42; White 6-26 and 6-57 
|- 
|6
|09 Jun 1913 
|  Sussex     County Ground, Hove 
|bgcolor="#FF0000"|Lost
| Innings and 92 runs
 | Relf 6-46 and 5-23; T Forrester 5-76; Holloway 5-69 
|- 
|7
|12 Jun 1913 
| Hampshire   County Ground, Derby 
|bgcolor="#FF0000"|Lost
| 9 wickets
 | Bowell 104; Newman 6-51; SWA Cadman 5-78 
|- 
|8
|21 Jun 1913 
 | Northamptonshire  Miners Welfare Ground, Blackwell 
|bgcolor="#FF0000"|Lost
| 9 wickets
 | Seymour 136; Thompson 6-65 
|- 
|9
|28 Jun 1913 
| Leicestershire  Queen's Park, Chesterfield 
|bgcolor="#FF0000"|Lost
| Innings and 43 runs
 | de Trafford 137; Shipman 5-40 
|- 
|10
|04 Jul 1913 
| Nottinghamshire    Trent Bridge, Nottingham 
|bgcolor="#FF0000"|Lost
| Innings and 125 runs
 | T Forrester 7-127; Iremonger 6-21 
|- 
|11
|10 Jul 1913 
|  Sussex    County Ground, Derby 
|bgcolor="#FFCC00"|Drawn
|
 | Vine 136 
|- 
|12
|14 Jul 1913 
| SomersetCounty Ground, Derby 
|bgcolor="#FF0000"|Lost
| 59 runs
 | A Morton 7-43 and 6-75; White 5-45; Robson 5-51 
|- 
|13
|21 Jul 1913 
| Warwickshire Edgbaston, Birmingham 
|bgcolor="#FF0000"|Lost
| Innings and 31 runs
 | Parsons 118; Field 6-25 
|- 
|14
|26 Jul 1913 
| LeicestershireBath Grounds, Ashby-de-la-Zouch 
|bgcolor="#FFCC00"|Drawn
|
 | SWA Cadman 122; Astill 5-59; CF Root 5-32; Wood 5-33 
|- 
|15
|04 Aug 1913 
| Essex   County Ground, Derby 
|bgcolor="#FFCC00"|Drawn
|
 | Freeman 100; SWA Cadman 7-39; Davies 6-57 
|- 
|16
|08 Aug 1913 
| Lancashire   Old Trafford, Manchester 
|bgcolor="#FFCC00"|Drawn
|
 | J Tyldesley 5-59; T Forrester 6-72; Dean 5-55 
|- 
|17
|15 Aug 1913 
| Northamptonshire   County Ground, Northampton 
|bgcolor="#FF0000"|Lost
| 151 runs
| FC Bracey 6-62; S SMith 6-82; A Morton 6-95 
|- 
|18
|23 Aug 1913 
| Nottinghamshire     Queen's Park, Chesterfield 
|bgcolor="#00FF00"|Won
| 21 runs
 | Iremonger 6-63; Wass 6-16; A Morton 6-33 
|-

Statistics

County Championship batting averages

County Championship bowling averages

Wicket Keepers
Joe Humphries  Catches 30,  Stumping  5

See also
Derbyshire County Cricket Club seasons
1913 English cricket season

References

1913 in English cricket
Derbyshire County Cricket Club seasons
English cricket seasons in the 20th century